Piper Alpha was an oil platform located in the North Sea approximately  north-east of Aberdeen, Scotland. It was operated by Occidental Petroleum (Caledonia) Limited (OPCAL) and began production in 1976, initially as an oil-only platform but later converted to add gas production.

Piper Alpha exploded and sank on 6 July 1988, killing 165 of the men on board, 30 of whose bodies were never recovered, as well as a further two rescue workers after their rescue vessel, which had been trapped in debris and immobilized, was destroyed by the disintegrating rig. Sixty-one workers escaped and survived. The total insured loss was about £1.7 billion (£ billion in ), making it one of the costliest man-made catastrophes ever. At the time of the disaster, the platform accounted for approximately 10% of North Sea oil and gas production. The accident is the world's worst offshore oil disaster in terms of lives lost and industry impact. The Inquiry blamed it on inadequate maintenance and safety procedures by Occidental, though no charges were brought.

In Aberdeen, the Kirk of St Nicholas on Union Street has dedicated a chapel in memory of those who died, containing a Book of Remembrance listing them. There is a memorial sculpture in the Rose Garden of Hazlehead Park.

Piper oilfield

Four companies that later became the OPCAL joint venture obtained an oil exploration licence in 1972. A gas recovery module was installed by 1980. OPCAL built the Flotta oil terminal in the Orkney Islands to receive and process oil from the Piper, Claymore, and Tartan oilfields, each with its own platform. The Tartan field also fed oil to Claymore field and then onto the main line to Flotta.

Construction
It was built in four modules separated by firewalls.

The platform was constructed by McDermott Engineering of Ardersier and Union Industrielle d'Entreprise of Cherbourg, with the sections united at Ardersier before being towed out during 1975. Production commenced in late 1976. For safety reasons the modules were organised so that the most dangerous platform operations took place far from the personnel areas. The conversion from oil to gas broke this safety concept, with the result that sensitive areas were brought together; for example, the gas compression was next to the control room. The close position of these two areas played a role in the accident.

Piper Alpha produced crude oil and natural gas from 36 wells for delivery to the Flotta oil terminal on Orkney and to other installations by three separate pipelines. At the time of the disaster, Piper was one of the heaviest platforms operating in the North Sea, along with Magnus and Brae B.

Construction upgrades and maintenance background

In 1978, major works were carried out to enable the platform to meet UK Government gas conservation requirements, and to avoid waste from the flaring of excess gas. After this work had been completed, Piper Alpha was operating in what was known as "phase 2 mode" (operating with the Gas Conservation Module (GCM)). From the end of 1980 until July 1988 phase 2 mode was its normal operating state. In the late 1980s, major construction, maintenance, and upgrade works were planned by Occidental and by July 1988, the rig was already well into major reconstruction, with six major projects identified, including the change-out of the GCM unit. This meant that the rig was returned to its initial phase 1 mode (i.e., operating without a GCM unit). Despite the complex and demanding work schedule, Occidental made the decision to continue operating the platform in phase 1 mode throughout this period and not to shut it down, as had been originally planned. The planning and controls that were put in place were thought to be adequate.

Because the platform was completely destroyed, and many of those involved died, analysis of events can only suggest a possible chain of events based on known facts. Some witnesses to the events question the official timeline.

Timeline of events

Preliminary events

 12:00, 6 July 1988: Two condensate pumps, designated A and B, were operating to displace the platform's condensate for transport to the coast. On the morning of 6 July, Pump A's pressure safety valve (PSV #504) was removed for routine maintenance. The pump's two-yearly overhaul was planned but had not started. The open condensate pipe was temporarily sealed with a disk cover (flat metal disc also called a blind flange or blank flange). Because the work could not be completed by 18:00, the disc cover remained in place. It was hand-tightened only. The on-duty engineer filled in a permit which stated that Pump A was not ready and must not be switched on under any circumstances.
 18:00: The day shift ended, and the night shift started with 62 men running Piper Alpha. As the on-duty custodian was busy, the engineer neglected to inform him of the condition of Pump A. Instead, he placed the permit in the control centre and left. This permit disappeared and was not found. Coincidentally there was another permit issued for the general overhaul of Pump A that had not yet begun.
19:00: Fire-fighting system put under manual control: Like many other offshore platforms, Piper Alpha had an automatic fire-fighting system, driven by both diesel and electric pumps (the latter were disabled by the initial explosions). The diesel pumps were designed to suck in large amounts of sea water for fire fighting; the pumps had automatic controls to start them in case of fire (in this case they could not be started remotely/manually because the control room was near the centre of the explosion and had been evacuated). A recommendation from an earlier audit had suggested that a procedure be developed to keep the pumps in automatic mode if divers were not working in the vicinity of the intakes as was the practice on the Claymore platform, but this was never implemented.
21:45: Pump B tripped and could not be restarted: Because of problems with the methanol system earlier in the day, methane clathrate (a flammable ice) had started to accumulate in the gas compression system pipework, causing a blockage. Due to this blockage, condensate (natural gas liquids NGL) Pump B stopped and could not be restarted. As the pumps normally fill condensate storage tanks, these tanks and pumps were equipped with timed safety systems to prevent overfilling or underfilling. As the entire electrical power on the platform was dependent on these safety systems (related to the pumps), they will trigger a complete and total power shutdown of the rig within 30 minutes if pump activity is not detected. Therefore the managers were under serious time pressure to avoid this. A search was made through the documents to determine whether Condensate Pump A could be started.

21:52: Permit for pump A PSV recertification not found and pump restarted: The permit for the overhaul was found, but not the other permit stating that the pump must not be started under any circumstances due to the missing safety valve. The valve was in a different location from the pump and therefore the permits were stored in different boxes, as they were sorted by location. None of those present were aware that a vital part of the machine had been removed. The manager assumed from the existing documents that it would be safe to start Pump A. The missing valve was not noticed by anyone, particularly as the metal disc replacing the safety valve was several metres above ground level and obscured by machinery.

First explosion and initial reactions

21:55: First explosion due to condensate leak from PSV flange. Condensate Pump A was switched on. Gas flowed into the pump, and because of the missing safety valve, produced an overpressure which the loosely fitted metal disc did not withstand. Gas audibly leaked out at high pressure, drawing the attention of several men and triggering six gas alarms including the high level gas alarm. Before anyone could act, the gas ignited and exploded, blowing through the firewall made up of  panels bolted together, which were not designed to withstand explosions. The explosion almost entirely destroyed the control room, killing key personnel responsible for coordination of the rig. Custodian Geoff Bollands, who had been in the room and witnessed the alarms going off, survived the blast and immediately activated the rig's emergency stop button before escaping, closing huge valves in the sea lines and ceasing all oil and gas extraction.

Theoretically, the platform would then have been isolated from the flow of oil and gas and the fire contained. However, because the platform was originally built for oil, the firewalls were designed to resist fire rather than withstand explosions. The first explosion broke the firewall and dislodged panels around Module (B). One of the flying panels ruptured a small condensate pipe, creating another fire.

22:04: Control room of Piper Alpha abandoned. A Mayday call was signalled via radio by the radio operator David Kinrade.  Piper Alpha's design made no allowances for the destruction of the control room, and the platform's organisation disintegrated. No attempt was made to use loudspeakers or to order an evacuation. Despite Bollands' activation of the emergency stop, there were no alarms warning workers of the unfolding disaster, as much of their systems had been destroyed by the initial blast.
22:05: The Search and Rescue station at RAF Lossiemouth received its first call notifying them of the possibility of an emergency, and a No. 202 Sqn Sea King helicopter, "Rescue 138", took off at the request of the Coastguard station at Aberdeen. The station at RAF Boulmer was also notified, and a Hawker Siddeley Nimrod maritime patrol aircraft from RAF Kinloss was sent to the area to act as "on-scene commander" using the designation "Rescue Zero-One".
22:06: The heat from the flames ruptures crude oil storage tanks in Module B, flooding the area with crude oil, which ignites almost instantaneously, creating a black plume of smoke characteristic of oil fires, as seen in photographs from nearby ships. The burning oil later drips onto a lower platform used by the rig for diving operations. The platform floor consisted of steel grates and under normal circumstances would have allowed the burning oil to drip harmlessly into the sea, but divers on the previous shift had placed rubber matting on the metal grate (likely to cushion their bare feet from the sharp metal grates), allowing the oil to form a burning puddle on the platform.

Subsequent explosions

22:20: The heat from the burning oil collecting on the diving platform causes the nearby Tartan pipeline, pressurized to 120 atmospheres, to rupture violently, releasing 15-30 tonnes ( of its highly flammable contents at immense pressure every second, which immediately ignited into a massive fireball, the heat and vibrations of which was felt by the crews in vessels as far away as one kilometer from the rig. From that moment on, the platform's destruction was inevitable.
22:30: The Tharos, a large semi-submersible fire fighting, diving / rescue and accommodation vessel, drew alongside Piper Alpha. The Tharos used its water cannon where it could, but it was restricted, because the cannon was so powerful it would injure or kill anyone hit by the water. Tharos was equipped with a hospital with an Offshore Medic assisted by Diver Paramedics from the Tharos Saturation Diving team.  A triage and reception area was set up on the vessel's helideck to receive injured casualties.
22:50: The MCP-01 pipeline fails and explodes, shooting huge flames over  into the air. The Tharos was driven off by the heat, which began to melt the surrounding machinery and steelwork. It was only after this explosion that the Claymore platform stopped pumping oil. Personnel still left alive were either desperately sheltering in the scorched, smoke-filled accommodation block or leaping from the various deck levels, including the helideck,  into the North Sea. The explosion destroys a fast rescue boat launched from the standby vessel Sandhaven that had been trapped in debris during a rescue attempt, killing nearly all of the crewmen on board with the exception of driver Ian Letham, as well as the six Piper Alpha survivors they had rescued from the water. Sandhaven was the standby vessel for Santa Fe 135, several miles away.
23:18: The Claymore gas line ruptures and explodes, adding even more fuel to the already massive firestorm on board Piper Alpha. With thousands of cubic metres of highly volatile fuel burning every second, the 20,000-tonne steel platform melted over the next 80 minutes.

Rescue crews arrive and platform collapses

23:35: Helicopter "Rescue 138" from Lossiemouth arrives at the scene.
23:37: Tharos contacts Nimrod "Rescue Zero-One" to apprise it of the situation. A standby vessel has picked up 25 casualties, including three with serious burns, and another one with an injury. Tharos requests the evacuation of its non-essential personnel to make room for incoming casualties. "Rescue 138" is requested to evacuate 12 non-essential personnel from Tharos to transfer to Ocean Victory, before returning with paramedics.
23:50: With critical support structures burned away, and with nothing to support the heavier structures on top, the platform began to collapse. One of the cranes collapsed, followed by the drilling derrick. The generation and utilities Module (D), which included the fireproofed accommodation block, and was still occupied by crewmen who had sheltered there, slipped into the sea. The largest part of the platform followed it. "Rescue 138" lands on Tharos  and picks up the 12 non-essential personnel, before leaving for Ocean Victory.
23:55: "Rescue 138" arrives at Ocean Victory and deposits the 12 passengers before returning to Tharos with four of Ocean Victory's paramedics.
00:07, 7 July: "Rescue 138" lands paramedics on Ocean Victory.
00:17: "Rescue 138" winches up serious burns casualties picked up by the Standby Safety Vessel, MV Silver Pit.
00:25: First seriously injured survivor of Piper Alpha is winched aboard "Rescue 138".
00:45: The entire platform is gone. Module (A) was all that remained of Piper Alpha.
00:48: "Rescue 138" lands on Tharos with three casualties picked up from MV Silver Pit.
00:58: Civilian Sikorsky S-61 helicopter of Bristow Helicopters arrives at Tharos from Aberdeen with medical emergency team.
01:47: Coastguard helicopter lands on Tharos with more casualties.
02:25: First helicopter leaves Tharos with casualties for Aberdeen Royal Infirmary.
03:27: "Rescue 138" lands on Tharos with the bodies of two fatalities. "Rescue 138" then leaves to refuel on the drilling rig Santa Fe 135.
05:15: "Rescue 137" arrives at Tharos, lands, then leaves taking casualties to Aberdeen.
06:21: Uninjured survivors of Piper Alpha leave Tharos by civilian S-61 helicopter for Aberdeen.
07:25: "Rescue 138" picks up remaining survivors from Tharos for transfer to Aberdeen.

Casualties

At the time of the disaster 226 people were on the platform; 165 died and 61 survived. Two men from the Sandhaven, which was the standby vessel for the nearby Santa Fe 135, were also killed in attempts to pick up survivors in the Sandhavens Fast Rescue Boat. The Coxswain (Iain Letham) was the only survivor. The standby vessel for Piper Alpha was the Silver Pit, which by co-incidence was also the standby vessel in the Ekofisk Field when the Alexander Kielland capsized on 27 March 1980.

Aftermath
There is controversy about whether there was sufficient time for a more effective emergency evacuation. The first explosion killed most of the personnel with the authority to order an evacuation when it destroyed the control room, and much of the control systems in the room responsible for sounding platform-wide alarms had also been lost with its destruction. This was a consequence of the platform design, which did not include blast walls. Another contributing factor was that the nearby connected platforms Tartan and Claymore continued to pump gas and oil to Piper Alpha until its pipeline ruptured in the heat in the second explosion. Their operations crews did not believe they had authority to shut off production, even though they could see that Piper Alpha was burning.

The nearby diving support vessel Lowland Cavalier reported the initial explosion just before 22:00, and the second explosion occurred 22 minutes later. By the time civil and military rescue helicopters reached the scene, flames over 100 metres in height and visible as far away as 100 km (120 km from the Maersk Highlander) away prevented safe approach. The largest number of survivors (37 out of 59) were recovered by the Fast Rescue Boat of the Standby Safety Vessel, MV Silver Pit; coxswain James Clark later received the George Medal as did Iain Letham of the Sandhaven. Others awarded the George Medal were Charles Haffey from Methil, Andrew Kiloh from Aberdeen, and James McNeill from Oban. Sandhaven crewmates Malcolm Storey, from Alness, and Brian Batchelor, from Scunthorpe, were awarded George Medals posthumously.

The blazing remains of the platform were eventually extinguished three weeks later by a team onboard MSV Tharos led by firefighter Red Adair, despite reported conditions of  winds and  waves. The part of the platform which contained the galley where about 100 victims had taken refuge was recovered by divers in late 1988 from the sea bed, and the bodies of 87 men were found inside.

Inquiry and safety recommendations

The Cullen Inquiry was set up in November 1988 to establish the cause of the disaster. It was chaired by the Scottish judge William Cullen. After 180 days of proceedings, it released its report Public Inquiry into the Piper Alpha Disaster (short: Cullen Report) in November 1990. It concluded that the initial condensate leak was the result of maintenance work being carried out simultaneously on a pump and related safety valve. The inquiry was critical of Piper Alpha's operator, Occidental, which was found guilty of having inadequate maintenance and safety procedures, but no criminal charges were ever brought against the company.

The second part of the report made 106 recommendations for changes to North Sea safety procedures:
37 recommendations covered procedures for operating equipment, 32 the information of platform personnel, 25 the design of platforms and 12 the information of emergency services
The responsibility to implement was for 57 with the regulator, 40 for the operators, 8 for the industry as a whole and 1 for stand-by ship owners.

The recommendations led to the enactment of the Offshore Safety Act 1992 and the making of the Offshore Installations (Safety Case) Regulations 1992.

Most significant of these recommendations was that operators were required to present a safety case and that the responsibility for enforcing safety in exploitation operations in the part of the North Sea apportioned to the UK should be moved from the Department of Energy to the Health and Safety Executive, as having both production and safety overseen by the same agency was a conflict of interest.

In 2013, on the 25th anniversary of the disaster, the video Remembering Piper - The Night That Changed Our Lives was released by Step Change in Safety. A three-day conference was held in Aberdeen to reflect on lessons learned from Piper Alpha and industry safety issues in general.

Insurance claims

The disaster led to insurance claims of around US$1.4 billion, making it at that time the largest insured man-made catastrophe. The insurance and reinsurance claims process revealed serious weaknesses in the way insurers at Lloyd's of London and elsewhere kept track of their potential exposures, and led to their procedures being reformed.

Legacy

Survivors and relatives of those who died went on to form the Piper Alpha Families and Survivors' Association, which campaigns on North Sea safety issues. The wreck buoy marking the remains of the Piper is approximately 1.1 nautical miles from the replacement Piper Bravo platform. A lasting effect of the Piper Alpha disaster was the establishment of Britain's first "post-Margaret Thatcher" trade union, the Offshore Industry Liaison Committee.

Beginning in 1998, one month after the tenth anniversary, Professor David Alexander, director of the Aberdeen Centre for Trauma Research at Robert Gordon University carried out a study into the long-term psychological and social effects of Piper Alpha. He managed to find 36 survivors who agreed to give interviews or complete questionnaires. Almost all of this group reported psychological problems. More than 70% of those interviewed reported psychological and behavioural symptoms of post traumatic stress disorder. Twenty-eight said they had difficulty in finding employment following the disaster; it appears that some offshore employers regarded Piper Alpha survivors as "Jonahs" – bringers of bad luck, who would not be welcome on other rigs and platforms. The family members of the dead and surviving victims also reported various psychological and social problems. Alexander also wrote that "some of these lads are stronger than before Piper. They've learned things about themselves, changed their values, some relationships became stronger. People realised they have strengths they didn't know they had. There was a lot of heroism took place."

Memorials

On 6 July 1991, the third anniversary of the disaster, a memorial sculpture showing three oil workers was erected in the Rose Garden within Hazlehead Park in Aberdeen.  The figures represent on the west the physical nature of offshore trades, the east youth and eternal movement and the north holds an unwinding spiral that represents oil in the left hand. The sculptor is Sue Jane Taylor, the Scottish artist who had visited the Piper platform the previous year, and based much of her work around what she saw in and around the oil industry. One of the survivors was used as a model for one of the figures. In 1991, Scottish composer James MacMillan wrote "Tuireadh", a piece for clarinet and string quartet, as a musical complement to the memorial sculpture. In 2008, to mark the 20th anniversary of the disaster, a stage play, Lest We Forget was commissioned by Aberdeen Performing Arts and written by playwright Mike Gibb. It was performed in Aberdeen in the week leading up to the anniversary with the final performance on 6 July 2008, the 20th anniversary.

Media

The incident was featured in the 1990 STV documentary television series Rescue, about the RAF Search and Rescue Force at RAF Lossiemouth, in the episode "Piper Alpha". Coincidentally, the film crew had been documenting the rescue teams at Lossiemouth at the time of the Piper Alpha accident.

On 6 July 2008, BBC Radio 3 broadcast a 90-minute play entitled Piper Alpha. Based on the actual evidence given to the Cullen Inquiry, the events of that night were retold twenty years to the minute after they happened.

National Geographic featured this incident in its Seconds From Disaster documentary as the episode "Explosion in the North Sea".

The 2013 documentary film Fire in the Night is about the disaster. It was made by Berriff McGinty Films and co-produced by STV. Producer and cameraman Paul Berriff had been with Sea King R137 filming their search and rescue activities in the Scottish highlands for a television series, and was able to accompany the helicopter during the Piper Alpha disaster, filming events as they happened.

In 2018, the disaster was featured on the History documentary series James Nesbitt's Disasters That Changed Britain. Testimonials were heard from survivors and relatives of victims.

References

External links

Oil and Gas Resources of the United Kingdom Volume 2 1998 – DTI publication (2005 archive)
On This Day – BBC News article (6 July 1988)
Piper Alpha disaster – on Education Scotland website (2013 archive)

Collapsed oil platforms
Oil platforms off Scotland
Natural gas platforms
1988 disasters in the United Kingdom
1988 in Scotland
Gas explosions
Explosions in Scotland
History of Aberdeen
History of the North Sea
July 1988 events in the United Kingdom
North Sea energy
1988 industrial disasters
Industrial fires and explosions in the United Kingdom
Explosions in 1988
Oil platform disasters
Maritime incidents in 1988
Engineering failures
Public inquiries in Scotland
1976 establishments in Scotland
1988 disestablishments in Scotland
Building collapses in the United Kingdom
Building collapses caused by fire